The Shinji Shōbōgenzō (真字正法眼蔵) or True Dharma Eye 300 Cases (Shōbōgenzō Sambyakusoku), or Treasury of the True Dharma Eye (Mana Shōbōgenzō), compiled by Eihei Dōgen in 1223–1227, was first published in Japanese in 1766. The literary sources of the Shinji Shōbōgenzō are believed to have been the Keitoku Dentōroku and the Shūmon Tōyōshū. It is written in Chinese, the language of the original texts from which the kōans were taken.

Background
Regardless of a few instances where Dōgen criticized the study of kōans, legend states that the young monk stayed up all night copying the Blue Cliff Record before his journey China (although this story is likely apocryphal, given the great length of the text). Dōgen's first teacher, Eisai, taught the importance of kōan introspection. While establishing the Kōshōhōrin-ji, Dōgen gathered the three hundred kōans featured in the Shinji Shōbōgenzō.

English translations

See also 
Shōbōgenzō
101 Zen Stories
The Gateless Gate
Blue Cliff Record
Book of Equanimity

References

External links 
 
Introduction to the Shinji Shobogenzo translated by Gudo Wafu Nishijima - Edited by Michael Luetchford & Jeremy Pearson
 Dogen's 300 Koans by Daido Loori, delivered at the Symposium on Dogen Zen at Stanford University
 comments on koans from Dogen's Treasury of the True Dharma Eye by John Daido Loori, in Buddhadharma: The Practitioner's Quarterly
 The 300 koan-s of the Mana Shōbōgenzō

13th-century books
Soto Zen
Zen texts